Gabino Ezeiza is a station on the Buenos Aires Premetro. The station is on the branch that terminates at General Savio station. It was opened on 29 April 1987 together with the other Premetro stations. The station is located between the Barrios of Villa Lugano and Villa Riachuelo, near the Autódromo Juan y Oscar Gálvez.

From here passengers may transfer to the Metrobus Sur BRT line.

References

Buenos Aires PreMetro stations
Buenos Aires Underground stations
Railway stations opened in 1987